Gottfried Hagen (1230–1299) was town clerk of Cologne and author of the Cologne Reimchronik (Rhymed Chronicle).

Hagen was born in Xanten and educated at the Stiftsschule (today's Stiftsgymnasium Xanten).  He filled many influential positions, and took an active part in the public life of his native city. Subsequently, to the year 1268, he is mentioned repeatedly in documents as "Magister Godefridus clericus Coloniensis", "Notarius civitatis Coloniensis", pastor (plebanus) of St. Martin the Lesser at Cologne, and dean of the chapter of St. George. He gives his name with the title town-clerk (der stede schriver) at the end of his Book of the City of Cologne (Dit is dat boich van der stede Colne). This Reimchronik is a very remarkable work of some 3,000 couplets; as a chronicle it is almost complete, if based at times on unreliable traditions. At earliest, it was written in 1270 with a supplement in 1271; it cannot have appeared later than the period between 1277 and 1287.

After a legendary introduction, permeated with the idea of municipal liberty, it recounts the conflicts between the city of Cologne and the Archbishops Conrad and Engelbert II, and the feuds between the patrician party and the guilds in the years 1252–1271. Its arrangement is simple, its style negligent, and its artistic merit slight, although it does not lack some lively descriptions. The importance of the chronicle lies in its contents. No other German city has records so complete and so full of life for this early period. For historical purposes, however, it should be used with great caution. It is true that the strictures formerly passed upon its reliability have proved to be very exaggerated. In rehearsing facts the work is fairly accurate, but Hagen is a thorough partisan, and an enthusiastic patriot. He was an adherent of the group of patricians led by his relatives, the "Overstolzen", and he opposed bitterly both the party of the "Weisen", the despised guilds, and also the archbishops of Cologne, who, as lords of the city, were the natural enemies of the development of Cologne into a free imperial city. Nevertheless, the bishops and still more the see are always treated with respect. It cannot be said that Hagen forged facts, but he modified them, and his judgment is coloured to a high degree by party spirit. His curious book is not so much a chronicle as a pamphlet written for a purpose. It was highly esteemed in Cologne as a plea for municipal liberty. Several medieval chroniclers have drawn largely upon its contents. For a critical edition of the Reimchronik, see Cardauns and Schröder in Chroniken der niederrheinischen Städte: Köln, I, 1–236, in Chroniken der deutschen Städte, XII (Leipzig, 1875); cf. III, 963.

References

1230 births
1299 deaths
People from Xanten
People from the Electorate of Cologne
City and town clerks
German male writers